Bogusław Kanicki (born 9 July 1953) is a Polish volleyball player. He competed in the men's tournament at the 1980 Summer Olympics.

References

External links
 

1953 births
Living people
People from Puławy
Polish men's volleyball players
Olympic volleyball players of Poland
Volleyball players at the 1980 Summer Olympics
Resovia (volleyball) players
Resovia (volleyball) coaches